Braxton is a surname. Notable people with the surname include:

 Carter Braxton (1736–1797), signer of the United States Declaration of Independence and a representative of Virginia
 Elliott Muse Braxton (1823–1891), Virginia politician, and Confederate army officer
 Carter Moore Braxton (1836–1898), Virginia civil engineer and businessman, and Confederate artillery officer
 Allen Caperton Braxton (1862–1914), Virginia lawyer
 Hezekiah Braxton (1936–2013), American football player
 Edward Braxton (born 1944), American Roman Catholic Bishop of Belleville
 Anthony Braxton (born 1945), American musician and composer
 Evelyn Braxton (born 1948), American singer
 Joanne Braxton (born 1950), American author, teacher, and literary critic
 Dwight Muhammad Qawi (formerly Dwight Braxton, born 1953), American boxer
 Toni Braxton (born 1967), American singer, actor, producer
 Traci Braxton (born 1971), American singer
 Towanda Braxton (born 1973), American actor
 Trina Braxton (born 1974), American singer
 Tamar Braxton (born 1977), American singer
 Tyondai Braxton (born 1978), American musician and composer
 Keith Braxton (born 1997), American basketball player

Fictional characters 

 Captain Braxton, character in the Star Trek universe
 Casey Braxton, Darryl Braxton and Heath Braxton, on the Australian soap opera Home and Away

English-language surnames